El Al Flight 426 was an El Al passenger flight hijacked on July 23, 1968 by three members of the Popular Front for the Liberation of Palestine (PFLP), setting off a wave of hijackings by the PFLP. Scholars have characterized the hijacking as significant in the advent of modern international air terrorism.

History
The aircraft, a Boeing 707, was scheduled to fly from Leonardo da Vinci-Fiumicino Airport in Rome to Lod Airport, now known as Ben Gurion International Airport. The plane was diverted to Algiers.

After the aircraft departed Rome, the pilots requested coffee from the cabin crew. As the coffee was being brought up to the pilots, two of the hijackers forced their way through the door to the flight deck, one of them clubbed the flight engineer with the butt of his pistol and ordered the plane to fly to Algiers. The remaining hijacker threatened the passengers with a pistol and an unpinned hand grenade.

When the plane landed at Dar El Beida, Algerian authorities grounded the plane. The following day they sent all non-Israeli passengers to France on Air Algérie Caravelle jets. Ten women and children were released over the weekend. The remaining 12 Israeli passengers, and the crew of 10 were held as hostages for the remainder of the hijacking.
The hijackers were identified as members of the Popular Front for the Liberation of Palestine. They were equipped with Iranian and Indian passports. The hijackers were carefully chosen by the PFLP because of their occupations (a pilot, a colonel in the Palestinian army, and a karate teacher).

The Israeli and Algerian governments negotiated the return of the hostages and plane through diplomatic channels. Five weeks later, everyone was released in exchange for 16 convicted Arab prisoners.  According to the BBC, lasting 40 days, it was the longest hijacking of a commercial flight.

Pilot Oded Abarbanell later wrote a memoir of his experience during the hijacking.

See also

List of aircraft hijackings
Airport security
Lufthansa Flight 181
Operation Entebbe

References

Aircraft hijackings
El Al accidents and incidents
1968 in Israel
Palestinian terrorist incidents in Europe
Popular Front for the Liberation of Palestine attacks
Attacks on aircraft by Palestinian militant groups
Terrorist incidents in Europe in 1968
July 1968 events in Europe
Terrorist incidents in Italy in 1968
Terrorist incidents in the United Kingdom in 1968
1968 crimes in Italy
1968 crimes in the United Kingdom
Accidents and incidents involving the Boeing 707
Aircraft hijackings in the United Kingdom